Hernán Ismael Galíndez (30 March 1987) is a professional footballer who plays as a goalkeeper for Ecuadorian Serie A club Aucas.

He began his career in Argentina with Rosario Central before settling in Ecuador with Universidad Católica, where he made over 300 appearances in a nine-year spell. In 2022, he joined Universidad de Chile but left the club after six months, citing harassment from the club's fanbase. He returned to Ecuador with Aucas, helping the side win the first title in the club's history in his debut season.

Born in Argentina, he plays for the Ecuador national team and represented them at both the 2021 Copa America and the 2022 FIFA World Cup, playing three times in each tournament.

Club career

Early career
As a child, Galíndez played for local youth club Estrella Juniors as a midfielder. During a local youth tournament at the age of seven, he switched to play as a goalkeeper and faced a neighbouring team featuring Lionel Messi. Galíndez later recounted that Messi scored the first goal he had ever conceded, although his team went on to win and  he and his teammates were awarded a bicycle for winning. At the age of 10, he joined the Rosario Central youth team, remaining with the club until he was 21, spending a period on loan with Quilmes during the 2010–11 season. When the club was relegated in 2010, both Galíndez and his family received death threats and he contemplated giving up the game.

In 2012, Galíndez was released by Rosario and joined Rangers de Talca, but he only took part in the preseason until he was loaned to Universidad Católica del Ecuador in the Ecuadorian Serie B. Having never left Argentina before, Galíndez was offered a room by teammate Facundo Martínez on arrival. He helped the club win promotion to the Ecuadorian Serie A in his first season.

On 6 March 2016, he saved two penalties in a game against L.D.U. Quito, securing a 1–1 draw for his side.

Universidad de Chile
Galíndez signed for Chilean side Universidad de Chile in January 2022 on a two-year deal with the club having the option of a third. He made his debut for the side in a 4-2 victory over Unión La Calera on 6 February 2022. He made 14 appearances for the side before personal issues led him to request a transfer. After FIFA rejected Chile's appeal against Ecuador's qualification for the 2022 FIFA World Cup over the fielding of an ineligible player, Galíndez claimed he was targeted by angry Chilean fans on social media as an Ecuadorian international. This was the second complaint of harassment by fans made by Galíndez following his transfer after his wife received abusive messages online.

Aucas
Universidad received approaches from L.D.U. Quito, but Galíndez instead chose to join rival Ecuadorian side Aucas with the agreed fee being reported around $250,000. He made his debut for the club in a 2–0 victory over Orense on 9 July and was not on the losing side for the remainder of the season over 13 matches. He helped the side win the Ecuadorian Serie A for the first time in the club's history, defeating Barcelona 1–0 on aggregate in the final. In the decisive second leg of the final, Galíndez saved a penalty from Barcelona captain Damián Díaz to help his side to victory and end the season with six consecutive clean sheets.

International career
Born in Argentina, Galíndez became a nationalised Ecuadorian in February 2019, a process which he had originally started in 2016. He was called-up to the Ecuador national team for the first time by manager Gustavo Alfaro in October 2020 as a replacement for Johan Padilla who tested positive for COVID-19. He was selected for the Ecuador squad for the 2021 Copa América and made his international debut on 23 June 2021 in a 2–2 draw with Peru in Ecuador's third group match. He played the remainder of his side's matches as they reached the quarter-finals before being eliminated by Argentina.

After going seven games without conceding a goal, Galíndez was selected for the 2022 FIFA World Cup and was chosen as the starting goalkeeper in all three of his nation's matches, ahead of Alexander Domínguez, as they were eliminated in the group stage.

Style of play
Galíndez has been described as a "complete goalkeeper", possessing quick reflexes but also being able to play well with the ball at his feet.

Personal life
Galíndez has a twin brother.

Honours
Universidad Católica
Ecuadorian Serie B (1): 
SD Aucas
Ecuadorian Serie A (1): 2022

References

External links

 

1987 births
Living people
Footballers from Rosario, Santa Fe
Ecuadorian footballers
Ecuador international footballers
Argentine footballers
Argentine emigrants to Ecuador
Naturalized citizens of Ecuador
Ecuadorian people of Argentine descent
Sportspeople of Argentine descent
Association football goalkeepers
Rosario Central footballers
Quilmes Atlético Club footballers
Rangers de Talca footballers
C.D. Universidad Católica del Ecuador footballers
Universidad de Chile footballers
S.D. Aucas footballers
Argentine Primera División players
Primera Nacional players
Ecuadorian Serie A players
Chilean Primera División players
Expatriate footballers in Ecuador
Argentine expatriate sportspeople in Ecuador
Expatriate footballers in Chile
Argentine expatriate sportspeople in Chile
Ecuadorian expatriate sportspeople in Chile
2021 Copa América players
2022 FIFA World Cup players